The Yaesu FT-2900R is a VHF 2M FM mobile amateur radio transceiver.  It is no longer in production and has been replaced by the FT-2980.

Technical description 
 Transmit Frequency Range 144 MHz to 148 MHz (alternate 144 MHz to 146 MHz)
 Receive Frequency Range  136 MHz to 174 MHz (alternate 144 MHz to 148 MHz)
 Emission: FM
 Power Output: FM 5W / 10W / 30W / 75W
 Standard Repeater Shift: +/- 600 kHz
 Audio Output: 3W into 4 Ohms @10% THD
 Antenna Impedance: 50 Ohms unbalanced
 Supply voltage 13.8V DC +/- 15% negative ground
 Current Consumption (typical)
 Receive with audio: 0.7A
 Receive squelched: 0.3A
 Transmit at 75W: 15A
 Transmit at 30W: 9A
 Transmit at 10W: 5A
 Transmit at 5W: 4A
 Memories
 200 "Basic" channels
 10 band edge channels
 1 "Home" channel
 CTCSS: 50 standard CTCSS tones
 DCS Encoder/Decoder: 104 standard DCS codes
 6 digit LCD display with dimmer
 Time out timer: 1min / 3min / 5min / 10min / off
 Automatic Power Off: 30min / 1h / 3h / 5h / 8h / off
 Automatic repeater shift.
 Large heatsink, no fan design
 Internal temperature sensor
 Weight: 4.2 pounds

The case has 2 analog potentiometers for volume and squelch.  One large rotary dial for frequency and data entry.  One power button and 5 functions buttons are also included.  The MH-48 hand microphone has a DTMF keypad, as well as additional function buttons.  The face of the radio does not detach for remote mounting.

References 

 Yaesu website FT-2900R
 Yaesu FT-2900R Owners Manual

External links 
 Yaesu website FT-2900R
 Yaesu FT-2900R Owners Manual
 eham.net Yaesu FT-2900R Reviews

Amateur radio transceivers